The Hampton Court branch line is a short railway branch line in Surrey, England, with stations at Thames Ditton and Hampton Court. Hampton Court Palace, an important tourist attraction, is close to the terminus across the River Thames in the London Borough of Richmond, but considerable residential development has taken place around the stations on the line and travel-to-work journeys are dominant. The branch leaves the London to Woking main line at Hampton Court Junction west of Surbiton station. The line is electrified on the third rail system.

The line was opened in 1849, and the terminus had four platforms, to handle peak levels of leisure travel, and goods facilities, although the platform accommodation has now been reduced and the goods facility closed. Electrification in 1916 was coupled with the provision of a grade-separated junction with the main line at Hampton Court Junction.

History

Authorisation and opening

The London and Southampton Railway opened its main line in stages; the section from Nine Elms to Woking (then called Woking Common) opened to the public on 21 March 1838. It had a station at Ditton Marsh, so named in official documentation at the time of opening. Bradshaw referred to the station as Esher for Hampton Court, at first. The London and Southampton Railway changed its name to the London and South Western Railway (LSWR) in 1839. Hampton Court Palace was visited by 178,000 people annually at the time, and in 1845 the LSWR decided to build a branch line to it, intending to provide a facility for the visiting public to enjoy the locality.

An authorising Act for a short branch line, of 1 mile 52 chains, was obtained on 16 July 1846. The Joseph Locke proposed extending the branch to Windsor, making multiple connections at Staines with other routes, actual and proposed. There was a delay to see whether a conflicting Bill might fail in Parliament, but it succeeded, so the original proposition prevailed, of a branch to Hampton Court only. Construction started in January 1848; the financial depression in force at the time meant that work had to be slowed, but the line opened on 1 February 1849. It is 1  mile 52 chains in length, on a continuous embankment, 18 feet high through Thames Ditton, only reaching level ground after crossing the river Mole. Its terminus is near Hampton Court bridge.

Hampton Court station was located between the mouths of the rivers Mole and Ember on an artificial island created by a creek which served a watermill and connected the two rivers. A small engine shed erected south of the Ember bridge survived when Jackson was writing in 1978, "heavily disguised as a plastics factory".

There is one intermediate station, at Thames Ditton. The Hampton Court terminus once had four platforms, as well as goods sidings and an engine shed.

Five trains ran each way daily, taking about forty-five minutes from or to Waterloo. Residential commuting has developed considerably, but visitors to the Palace continue to be a mainstay of the branch line.

Later enhancements
The line between Surbiton and Hampton Court Junction was quadrupled on 29 July 1883. Preparatory to electrification of the LSWR suburban routes, a flyover was constructed at Hampton Court Junction, carrying the down branch for Hampton Court over the main lines; it is approached by an independent down branch line from Surbiton station, climbing steadily on brick viaducts. The flyover was carried on a 160 feet steel truss girder bridge, crossing the quadruple track main line on a skew. It was commissioned on 4 July 1915. The electrification in the area, including the Hampton Court branch, was implemented on 18 June 1916.

Public funds assisted the improvement at the public approach to Hampton Court in 1933, when the road layout was upgraded in connection with the construction of the new Thames river bridge. The new Hampton Court Way passed directly in front of the station entrance, a great benefit compared with the former cramped access from Creek Road over the River Mole bridge.

Hurst Park Racecourse was opened in 1889 on the Surrey bank of the River Thames. It was a mile from Hampton Court station, and was the closest racecourse to central London, which made it popular. In 1899 Hampton Court station was enlarged and modernised, largely as a result of the race traffic and of course that to Hampton Court Palace. A branch line into the racecourse was considered about that time, but the potential cost was too heavy. In 1908 an additional two sidings were installed to hold empty stock awaiting return passengers at the end of the racing. The arrival and departure of horse boxes in connection with the races was a significant traffic. The Whitsun meeting was the busiest in the racing calendar, and in addition to the Palace visitors, the racegoers required typically fifty special trains to bring them to the races. Thames Ditton signalbox shortened the block sections, and on Whit Monday 1958 trains ran at five-minute intervals on the branch. Racing declined in the public interest in the early 1960s, and the racecourse was closed in October 1962 and developed into housing.

Horse traction
Horse traction appears to have been used in the earliest days on a few occasions. A correspondent using the pseudonym Medicus wrote to the Times Newspaper on 9 February 1849; that day he had caught the 12:15 train from Hampton Court to Kingston (now Surbiton) and was surprised to find it horse-drawn, as far as Hampton Court Junction, where the single vehicle was attached to a train from Dorchester, that had been delayed for the purpose. He asserted that this was a daily occurrence.

Services
Passenger train services are currently operated by South Western Railway. There is a half-hourly direct service to London Waterloo which calls at all stations on the route except for Queenstown Road (Battersea).

A typical journey time to or from Waterloo is 37 minutes (2022).

Rolling stock
The line is served by the British Rail Class 455, and British Rail Class 707, consisting of 4, 5, 8 or 10 car formations, 4 cars are mostly used at weekends. Class 450s have also deputised for the usual 455s on occasions.

Until 2022, Class 456 trains were often attached to Class 455 units to form ten carriage trains, but these were withdrawn on 17 January with the introduction of a new timetable.

See also
 South West Main Line

Notes

References

Rail transport in Surrey
Railway lines in South East England
Railway lines opened in 1849
1849 establishments in England